Khorramabad (also Romanized as Khorramābād) is a village in Fazl Rural District, in the Central District of Nishapur County, Razavi Khorasan Province, Iran. At the 2006 census, its population was 124, in 31 families.

References 

Populated places in Nishapur County